Moacir Fernandes, commonly known by the nickname Cafuringa (November 10, 1948 – July 25, 1991), was a Brazilian professional football right winger, who played for several Campeonato Brasileiro Série A clubs.

Brazilian footballer Cafu got his footballing name after Cafuringa.

Career
Born in Juiz de Fora, Minas Gerais state on November 10, 1948, Cafuringa started his professional career in 1965, playing for Botafogo. He then was transferred to Bangu, winning the Campeonato Carioca in 1969, 1971, 1973 and in 1975 as a Fluminense player. During that spell in Fluminense, he played 63 Campeonato Brasileiro Série A games. In 1976, he was transferred to Atlético Mineiro, where he played 19 Série A games. After defending Grêmio Maringá, Cafuringa returned to Fluminense, where he played 14 Série A games between 1977 and 1978. In 1979, he played six Série A games for Caldense, then he joined Venezuelan club Deportivo Táchira, where he retired.

After his retirement, Cafuringa played in the 1990 Pelé World Cup, which is a competition for over 35 retired footballers, scoring a goal in the final.

Death
Cafuringa died on July 25, 1991, in Jacarepaguá neighborhood, Rio de Janeiro, of sepsis, resulting from an injury in a Masters match.

References

1948 births
1991 deaths
People from Juiz de Fora
Brazilian footballers
Botafogo de Futebol e Regatas players
Bangu Atlético Clube players
Fluminense FC players
Associação Atlética Caldense players
Brazilian expatriate footballers
Association football wingers
Association football players who died while playing
Sport deaths in Brazil
Deaths from sepsis
Infectious disease deaths in Rio de Janeiro (state)
Sportspeople from Minas Gerais